Tang-e Namak (also Romanized as Tang-i-Namak; also known as Rok Rok and Rok Rok Tang-e Namak) is a village in Dehpir-e Shomali Rural District, in the Central District of Khorramabad County, Lorestan Province, Iran. At the 2006 census, its population was 315, in 72 families.

References 

Towns and villages in Khorramabad County